Thomas Gilbert Pearson (1873–1943), was an American conservationist and one of the first faculty members at the University of North Carolina at Greensboro. He was a founder of the National Association of Audubon Societies, which became the National Audubon Society. He was also a founder of the International Committee for Bird Protection (now BirdLife International).

Pearson grew up in the woods of central Florida, having moved there at the age of 9 from Dublin, Indiana.  He lived in a log cabin with his family of 3 brothers, 3 sisters, and his parents.  The Pearsons were members of the Society of Friends.  Encouraged by an older friend, Pearson began egg collecting.  This hobby caused him to play truant from school, which was one of the reasons for his bad school record.

At 13, he bought a gun, which he had long desired to own.  He learned that he could earn .90 to $1.25 by killing egrets to sell their plumes.  He also made money by selling many birds' eggs.

After learning how to mount birds, he gathered quite a collection.  He wrote to many schools and colleges, hoping to secure admission and pay for his education with his collection.  At the age of 18, in 1891, President Lyndon Hobbs of Guilford College accepted Pearson's offer.  In return, Pearson received board and tuition for two years if he would also collect and mount birds for the College.  At the end of 2 years of college, Pearson was given a scholarship to continue his studies at Guilford.  During his years at Guilford, he became editor of the college magazine, president of his literary society, manager of the baseball team, and captain of the football team.

After graduating from college, Pearson decided to devote his time and energy to arousing the people of North Carolina to the idea of protecting their fast-declining bird life.  He then became a biology teacher at Guilford College.  He also met Elsie Weatherly during this time.  The two married in 1902.  

In 1901, Pearson accepted the chair of biology and geology at the State Normal and Industrial College in Greensboro (now the University of North Carolina at Greensboro).  He took his classes on walks in the outdoors, believing this to be as important as laboratory work with a microscope.  During this period, he published his first book, Stories of Bird Life.  The founder and first president of the National Association of Audubon Societies, William Dutcher, saw this book and encouraged Pearson to organize an Audubon Society in North Carolina.  This he did in 1902, launching himself upon a course that would lead to influential work in state and national legislation.

Pearson used the platform of the society created in North Carolina to encourage the legislature to pass a law that would be the states' first step towards wildlife conservation.  That law passed in 1903 and was known as the "Audubon Law."  It gave the Audubon Society the power to enforce wildlife laws in North Carolina and authorized the Society to hire game wardens to carry out the enforcement.  These efforts were funded by donations from individuals as well as the sale of non-resident hunting licenses for $10 each.  The non-resident licenses were wildly unpopular even though most non-resident hunters at the time had the means to pay the fee associated with the license.  It was their belief that the license went against the tradition of Southern hospitality.

Pearson also went up against the fashion industry in the hopes of putting an end to plume hunting.  These plumes were often used in the clothing of the day.  The millinery industry was particularly resistant to this change, as hats featuring fine feathers were very popular.  Milliners feared the demand for their products would plummet without the feathers.  Pearson, a great orator, convinced an audience of fashionably attired women by educating them about the plumes featured in their hats.  He detailed for them how each species of bird represented had been slaughtered on its breeding grounds.

Upon returning from a trip to Mexico in 1911, Pearson was greeted with claims that the Audubon Society was making money off license fees and fines and that the Society was spending taxpayer's money on wildlife protection.  Both of those claims were untrue.  The effects of those claims, however, were detrimental to the Audubon Law passed in 1903, as counties were now allowed to exempt themselves from the law.  At year's end, only 46 of the State's 100 counties remained under the law.  From that time on, they advocated for a State Game Commission that would not come about until 1927 when a State Division of Game and Inland Fisheries was created as part of the N.C. Department of Conservation and Development.  It would not be until 1947 with the help of the N.C. Wildlife Federation and other agencies that North Carolina would see an independent wildlife agency run by a professionally trained staff—the N.C. Wildlife Commission.

In 1924, he was awarded the degree of Doctor of Laws from the University of North Carolina.  He received the medal of the John Burroughs Association, the National Order of the Oaken Crown from Luxembourg, and the medal of the Societe National d'Acclimatation from France.

Pearson became secretary of the National Association of Audubon Societies and later served as president for 14 years starting in 1920 with the death of William Dutcher.

References

 T. Gilbert Pearson (1873–1943)—Robert O'Hara
 Biography of T. Gilbert Pearson—T. Gilbert Pearson Audubon Society
 A Century of Conservation: Audubon Celebrates 100 Years in North Carolina (with some biographical material on Pearson)

External links
 
 
 

American ornithologists
1873 births
1943 deaths
American conservationists